Blair, Illinois may refer to:
Blair, Livingston County, Illinois, an unincorporated community in Livingston County
Blair, Randolph County, Illinois, an unincorporated community in Randolph County